Nazipur Municipality stands beside the Atrai River in the Naogaon District of the Division of Rajshahi, Bangladesh.  It is one of the most important place & Business center of Naogaon district. It is near about 36 km away from the Naogaon city.  It is a place of educated people, therefore there are many Schools, Colleges and Madrashas are established here.  It is the Upazila sadar of Patnitala. In this Upazila, Coal mining & Ceramic mining are preset. Also this area works as a food production & supply center of Naogaon.

Education

Primary schools
 Al-Hera Islami Academy
 Hatshaoli (Kanupara) Islamia Dakhil Madrasah
 Nazipur Govt: Primary School
 Chalkmomin Government Primary School
 Horirampur Primary School
 Puiya Primary School
 OXFORD Pre-Caded & Kindergarten School
 Holy Child Academi
 Maloncha Kindergarten School
 Saint Matthews English Medium
 Raghunathpur Primary School
 Fahimpur Primary School
 Nazipur Darul Ulum Caowmia Madrasha
 Nazipur Women's Madrasha
 Kundan Primary School
 Kashipur Primary school
 Sunrise kindergarten school
 Fulkuri Learner's Academy

Secondary schools
 Al-Hera Islami Academy
 Nazipur Government Model High School
 Puiya High School
 Nazipur Girl's High School
 Nazipur Siddkia Fazil Madrasha
 Chalknirkin High School
 Babnabaj Darul ulum Dakhil Madrasa
 Chalkmuli High School
 Kundan High School
 Goshnagar High School

Colleges
 Nazipur Government College
 Nazipur Women's College
 Nazipur Vocational School & College
 Nazipur Alim & Fazil Madrasha
 Polytechnic Institute
 Nazipur Institute of Engineering Technology, Nazipur Bazar, Patnitala.

Press Club 
Patnitala Press Club

Nazipur Press Club

Hats-Bazar's 

 Nazipur Natunhat
 Nazipur Puraton Bazar Hat
 Kashipur Hat

See also
 Somapura Mahavihara
 Patnitala Upazila
 Naogaon District

References

Municipalities in Naogaon District
Populated places in Rajshahi Division